Zapužane is a village in the municipality of Benkovac, Zadar County, Croatia.

Demographics
According to the 2011 census, the village of Zapužane has 56 inhabitants. This represents 10.24% of its pre-war population according to the 1991 census.

The 1991 census recorded that 97.25% of the village population were ethnic Serbs (532/547), 1.09 % were Croats (6/547) while 1.66% were of other ethnic origin (9/547).

Notable people

References

Benkovac
Populated places in Zadar County
Serb communities in Croatia